Franklin County is a county located in the U.S. state of Texas. As of the 2020 census, its population was 10,359. The county seat is Mount Vernon.

History
Franklin County was erected and established in 1875, four decades after the independence of Texas, from land ceded by neighboring Titus County. Although the origin of the county's name is not recorded, it is generally believed to have been named after Judge Benjamin C. Franklin, the first appointed justice in the Republic of Texas.

There are two historic properties listed on the National Register of Historic Places in Franklin County.

Franklin County was one of the last 30 prohibition, or entirely dry, counties in the state of Texas. Citizens of its county seat, Mount Vernon, voted to allow beer and wine sales, both on and off premises in May 2013.

Geography

Major highways
  Interstate 30
  U.S. Highway 67
  U.S. Highway 271
  State Highway 11
  State Highway 37

Adjacent counties
 Red River County (north)
 Titus County (east)
 Camp County (southeast)
 Wood County (south)
 Hopkins County (west)
 Delta County (northwest)

Communities

City
 Winnsboro (mostly in Wood County)

Town
 Mount Vernon (county seat)

Unincorporated communities
 Clearwater
 Cypress
 Daphne
 Eureka
 Hagansport
 Hopewell
 Lakeview
 Macon
 Majors
 New Hope
 Purley
 Scroggins

Demographics

Note: the US Census treats Hispanic/Latino as an ethnic category. This table excludes Latinos from the racial categories and assigns them to a separate category. Hispanics/Latinos can be of any race.

At the 2000 U.S. census, there were 9,458 people, 3,754 households, and 2,732 families residing in the county. The population density was 33 people per square mile (13/km2). There were 5,132 housing units at an average density of 18 per square mile (7/km2). The racial makeup of the county was 89.19% White, 3.94% Black or African American, 0.63% Native American, 0.21% Asian, 5.14% from other races, and 0.88% from two or more races. 8.90% of the population were Hispanic or Latino of any race. In 2020, the population was 10,359 and its racial and ethnic makeup was 76.03% non-Hispanic white, 3.80% African American, 0.38% Native American, 0.66% Asian, 0.06% Pacific Islander, 0.59% some other race, 4.44% multiracial, and 14.05% Hispanic or Latino of any race.

In 2000, the median income for a household in the county was $31,955, and the median income for a family was $37,064. Males had a median income of $28,806 versus $19,361 for females. The per capita income for the county was $17,563. About 12.50% of families and 15.60% of the population were below the poverty line, including 21.20% of those under age 18 and 12.30% of those age 65 or over. The median household income at the 2020 census increased to $59,632; the mean income was $82,203.

Economy
According to a study ordered by the Mount Vernon Economic Development Corporation in 2013, the local retail trade area population is 12,771 people. The county has 720 homes valued at $200,000 or more, 70 homes of $500,000 or more, and 72 homes valued at more than $1,000,000. Most of these homes are centered on Lake Cypress Springs, which was twice voted the Most Beautiful Lake in Texas by the readers of Dallas' "D" magazine (2005, 2010). The lake is located about 10 miles south of Mount Vernon. The EDC study determined the average sale price of lakefront property on Lake Cypress Springs (2012) was $484,000, with 91 percent of the 1,400 water-front homes being second residences. This concentration of second residences causes the population of the county to increase between 3,000 and 8,000 people on weekends and during holidays, according to estimates by the Franklin County Water District, which oversees the lake and its visitors.

Education
The following school districts serve Franklin County:
 Mount Vernon ISD
 Rivercrest ISD (partly in Red River, Titus counties)
 Saltillo ISD (mostly in Hopkins County)
 Sulphur Bluff ISD (mostly in Hopkins County)
 Winnsboro ISD (mostly in Wood County, small portion in Hopkins County)

Politics
Franklin County is represented in the Texas House of Representatives by the Republican Gary VanDeaver of New Boston, Texas (Tx.HR Dist. 1). They are represented in the Texas Senate by Republican Bryan Hughes of Mineola, Texas (Tx. Sen. Dist. 1). They are part of the Fourth Congressional District of Texas, represented by Republican U.S. Congressman John Ratcliffe of Rockwall, Texas, from 2005 to 2020.

See also

 Recorded Texas Historic Landmarks in Franklin County

References

External links
 Franklin County government's website
 Franklin County Genealogical Society
 

 
Populated places established in 1875
1875 establishments in Texas